The 2015 Horizon League women's basketball tournament, held from March 9–15, concluded the 2014–15 season of the Horizon League. For the first time, every game was available on an ESPN Network. Rounds 1 & 2 were on ESPN3, with the semifinals on TWCS and simulcast on ESPN3. The championship was on ESPNU. The tournament champion received an automatic bid to the 2015 NCAA tournament.

Seeds
All 9 Horizon League schools participated in the tournament. Teams were seeded by 2014–15 Horizon League season record. The top 7 teams received a first-round bye.

Seeding for the tournament was determined at the close of the regular conference season:

Schedule

Bracket

References

External links
 Horizon League Women's Basketball Tournament

2014–15 Horizon League women's basketball season
Horizon League women's basketball tournament